The Speed Traders, An Insider's Look at the New High-Frequency Trading Phenomenon That is Transforming the Investing World is a book on high-frequency trading, authored by Edgar Perez. It examines the 2010 Flash Crash incident that led to a significant decline in the value of U.S. stocks on May 6, 2010.

Publishing information
The book has been published in several languages: English by McGraw-Hill Inc. (The Speed Traders, An Insider's Look at the New High-Frequency Trading Phenomenon That is Transforming the Investing World, 2011), Mandarin Chinese by China Financial Publishing House, 2012) and Indonesiann by Kompas Gramedia (Investasi Super Kilat: Pandangan Orang dalam tentang Fenomena Baru Frekuensi Tinggi yang Mentransformasi Dunia Investasi, 2012).

Reviews
Book Review: 'The Speed Traders', seekingalpha, May 5, 2011
The Speed Traders, Futures, May 24, 2013

References

Finance books
2011 non-fiction books
McGraw-Hill books
Works about algorithmic trading